Stefan Paul Andres (26 June 1906 – 29 June 1970) was a German novelist.
He was nominated for the Nobel Prize in Literature.

As the Nazi regime flexed its power, Andres moved away to Italy in 1937, returning to Germany 13 years later.  He was a widely read German writer in the post-World War II period.

Works

 Bruder Lucifer (1932)
 Eberhard im Kontrapunkt (1933)
 Die Löwenkanzel (1933)
 Die unsichtbare Mauer (1934)
 Vom heiligen Pfäfflein Domenico (1936)
 Utz, der Nachfahr (1936)
 El Greco malt den Großinquisitor* (1936)
 Moselländische Novellen (1937)
 Der Mann von Asteri (1939) 
 Das Grab des Neides (1940)
 Der gefrorene Dionysos (1942) 
 Wir sind Utopia* (1942)
 Wirtshaus zur weiten Welt (1943)
 Ein Herz wie man braucht (1946)
 Die Söhne Platons (1946)
 Die Hochzeit der Feinde (1947)
 An Freund und Feind (1947)
 Ritter der Gerechtigkeit (1948)
 Tanz durchs Labyrinth (1948)
 Das Tier aus der Tiefe (1949)  
 Der Granatapfel (1950)
 Die Arche (1952)
 Der Knabe im Brunnen (1953)
 Die Rache der Schmetterlinge (1953)
 Die Reise nach Portiuncula (1954)
 Positana, Geschichten aus einer Stadt am Meer (1957)
 Der graue Regenbogen (1959)
 Die großen Weine Deutschlands (1961)
 Der Mann im Fisch (1963)
 Die biblische Geschichte* (1965)
 Der Taubenturm (1966)
 Ägyptisches Tagebuch (1967)
 Noah und seine Kinder (1968)
 Die Dumme (1969)
 Die Versuchung des Synesios (1970)

*indicates a work that has been translated into English

References
 Furness, Raymond and Malcolm Humble (1991). A Companion to Twentieth Century German Literature. London and New York: Routledge. .

Notes

1906 births
1970 deaths
People from Bernkastel-Wittlich
People from the Rhine Province
Writers from Rhineland-Palatinate
Commanders Crosses of the Order of Merit of the Federal Republic of Germany
20th-century German novelists
German male novelists
20th-century German male writers